Levier is a commune in the Doubs department in the Bourgogne-Franche-Comté region in eastern France. On 1 January 2017, the former commune of Labergement-du-Navois was merged into Levier.

Geography 

Population

Economy 
The economy is based on forestry.

See also
 Communes of the Doubs department

References

External links

 Levier on the intercommunal Web site of the department 

Communes of Doubs